Restoration of the Catholic hierarchy may refer to:

Restoration of the English hierarchy
Restoration of the Scottish hierarchy